The 2015 FC BATE Borisov season is the club's 28th season of existence and their 18th consecutive season in the Belarusian Premier League. BATE Borisov entered the season as the league's 10-time defending champions. Beyond the Premier League, BATE Borisov is participating in the UEFA Champions League and the Belarusian Cup.

The most notable accomplishment by the club this season was their domestic double, and reaching the UEFA Champions League group stage for the second time in their history. It was the also the second time a Belarusian football club reached the group stage of the Champions League. In their domestic league, Borisov went 11 matches before conceding a goal.

Squad

Non-competitive

Competitive

Belarusian Premier League

League table

Matches

Belarusian Cup

2014–15 

All previous rounds were played during the 2014 FC BATE Borisov season.

Quarterfinals

Semifinals

Final

2015–16 

The first match will be played in late November 2015

UEFA Champions League

Second qualifying round

Third qualifying round

Play-off round

Group stage

Belarusian Super Cup

Statistics

Appearances and goals 

|-
|}

Disciplinary

Goalscorers

Transfers

References 

Belarusian football clubs 2015 season
2015
BATE Borisov